Djamel Yahiouche (born 25 February 1959) is an Algerian swimmer. He competed in four events at the 1980 Summer Olympics.

References

External links
 

1959 births
Living people
Algerian male swimmers
Olympic swimmers of Algeria
Swimmers at the 1980 Summer Olympics
African Games silver medalists for Algeria
African Games medalists in swimming
Place of birth missing (living people)
Competitors at the 1978 All-Africa Games
21st-century Algerian people